Howz-e Sorkh may refer to:
 Howz-e Sorkh, Gonabad
 Howz-e Sorkh, Torbat-e Heydarieh